According to human rights groups, blasphemy laws in Pakistan are often exploited, even against Muslims, to settle personal rivalries or to persecute minorities. Almost any person speaking against blasphemy laws and proceedings can end up in lynchings or street vigilantism in Pakistan.

Arrests and death sentences issued for blasphemy laws in Pakistan go back to the late 1980s and early 1990s. Despite the implementation of these laws, no one has yet been executed by the order of the courts or government. People have only been imprisoned to await a verdict or killed at the hands of felons who were convinced that the suspects were guilty.

Notable incidents 
Some of the widely reported cases were (latest at top):
12 February 2022: A mentally unstable man, Mushtaq Ahmed, was stoned to death in Khanewal District in Punjab province for blasphemy. A mosque custodian informed fellow villagers, saying Ahmed was burning a copy of the Quran. Over 300 villagers gathered and stoned to Ahmed to death. Attempts by police to rescue him failed. 
8 February 2022: A Hindu teacher was sentenced to life imprisonment by a local court over charges of blasphemy in Sindh province. The teacher, Nautan Lal, was also fined Pakistani ₹50,000 by Additional Sessions Judge Murtaza Solangi in Ghotki. He was sentenced even after the student Muhammad Ihttisham who alleged him for blasphemy had retracted his statement. Muhammad Ihtisham later stated that his allegations were motivated & he was unhappy on scoldings he got from the teacher because of not finishing his assignments.
3 December 2021: Priyantha Kumara a Sri Lankan manager of a sports equipment factory in Sialkot, Punjab, was tortured and burnt to death on the street by a mob of Muslims after accusing him of blasphemy for "desecrating" stickers or posters containing the name of the Islamic prophet Muhammad.
28 November 2021: A police station in Mandani, Charsadda District, Khyber Pakhtunkhwa, was burned down by a mob of a few thousand who demanded that the police hand over a blasphemy suspect to them.
25 November 2021: Four Muslim men were charged with blasphemy for arguing with a imam while requesting to allow a funeral announcement from the village mosque for a Christian neighbour.  
In September 2021 a court in Lahore, Punjab, sentenced school principal Salma Tanveer to death for allegedly distributing photocopies of her writings denying the finality of prophethood and claimed herself as a prophet.
In September 2020, a court in Lahore, sentenced a Christian man, Asif Pervaiz, to death for sending a "blasphemous" message to his former supervisor at work in 2013. The defendant said that his supervisor had tried to convert him to Islam, which he refused to do; the court rejected his testimony.
 In August 2020, at least 42 cases pertaining to blasphemy were registered across Pakistan in a single month. Most of those accused of blasphemy belonged to the Shia community and were booked under sections 295-A and 298 of the Pakistan Penal Code for allegedly insulting the companions of Muhammad.
In July 2020, there was an attempt by Qamar Riaz, a local leader of the ruling party Pakistan Tehreek-e-Insaf, to file a blasphemy case against former Minister for Foreign Affairs, Khawaja Muhammad Asif, for allegedly claiming "Islam and all religions are equal" in a speech in Pakistan's National Assembly. The United States Commission on International Religious Freedoms expressed grave concerns against the same.
 In June 2020, an assistant professor of the Shah Abdul Latif University, Sajid Soomro, was arrested under contested blasphemy charges. Allegedly, he had claimed that Islam is a male-dominated religion. Another professor from the University of Sindh, Dr Arfana Mallah, came under severe pressure for believing the blasphemy laws were unfair. Various non-governmental organizations, including the Human Rights Commission of Pakistan, condemned the misuse of blasphemy laws in the case of professor Sajid Soomro.
 In 2019, Junaid Hafeez, formerly a lecturer at Bahauddin Zakariya University in Multan, Punjab, was sentenced to death for blasphemy. He was accused of insulting Muhammad on Facebook. Hafeez's first attorney, Rashid Rehman, was murdered in his office in 2014 after agreeing to represent him. The verdict prompted an outcry from human rights groups; Amnesty International called it a "'vile and gross miscarriage of justice".
In December 2017, a 58-year-old man accused of blasphemy was freed after spending over nine years in jail. Bahawalnagar District court and Lahore High Court sentenced the man to life imprisonment which was overruled by Supreme Court of Pakistan as the evidence used was not in accordance with the Evidence Act
 In July 2017, Faisal Mahmood was charged with blasphemy law U/S 295C by the court of magistrate special judicial Gujarat and could be sentence to death.
In April 2017, Mashal Khan, a Pakistani student at the Abdul Wali Khan University Mardan, was killed by an angry mob in the premises of the university over allegations of posting blasphemous content online.
 In March 2017, Prime Minister of Pakistan Nawaz Sharif supported a crackdown on blasphemous material posted on social media and described blasphemy as an "unpardonable offence". Shortly after, Pakistani blogger Ayaz Nizami, founder of realisticapproach.org, an Urdu website about atheism, and Vice President of Atheist & Agnostic Alliance Pakistan, was detained under the charges of blasphemy and could face the death penalty.
 In November 2016, a Facebook campaign was launched by the followers of Khadim Hussain Rizvi, against Malik Shahrukh, a PhD researcher who was previously associated with an Islamabad-based diplomatic news publication. Malik was accused of calling the Quran "an ordinary book, produced by Mohammad for economic and political purposes." A video of the local Imam of Sargodha, in which he incited people during the Friday sermon to kill Malik, went viral. Several applications were made to the authorities against Malik, demanding that he be sentenced to death. Authorities could not arrest Malik because he was not in Pakistan at the time. Sources claim that Malik is being framed for criticizing Tahreek-e-Labbaik and its chief.
 In January, 2014 Muhammad Asghar, a 70-year-old British man from Edinburgh, was convicted of blasphemy and sentenced to death by a court in Rawalpindi. Asghar had initially been arrested in 2010 after sending letters in which he declared himself a prophet, and had lived in Pakistan for several years prior to his arrest and trial. Javed Gul, a government prosecutor, disclosed to Agence France Presse that, "Asghar claimed to be a prophet even inside the court. He confessed it in front of the judge." Asghar's lawyers had argued during the trial that he should be granted leniency on account of a history of mental illness, but a medical panel later rejected this argument after reviewing his case.
 In September 2013, a Lahore-based woman Salma Fatima was arrested by police after she distributed pamphlets declaring herself a prophet.
 In October 2012 teacher Arfa Iftikhar was forced into hiding after a furious mob stormed Farooqi Girls High School in Lahore over a piece of homework she set that allegedly contained derogatory references to the Islamic prophet Muhammad.
 Rimsha Masih (some reports use the name "Rifta" or "Riftah") is a Pakistani child who was arrested in Islamabad by Pakistani police in August 2012 and who could face the death penalty for blasphemy for allegedly desecrating pages of the Quran (or a book containing verses from the Quran) by burning. She is a member of Pakistan's Christian minority.
 In July 2011 Muhammad Ajmal escaped the raid of a local religious group in Rawalpindi, Punjab, who later announced that anti-Islamic material and blasphemous material against Muhammad was found in his apartment, both printed and on his laptop. Ajmal disappeared in July 2011.
 On 12 December 2011, a teacher, Shahid Nadeem, in the missionary school of Faisalabad, Punjab, was accused by Qari Muhammad Afzal (a member of Lashkar-e-Jhangvi, a banned organisation) who registered an FIR on 28 December 2011 at the local police station claiming that the culprit had deliberately torn the pages of Quran and burned them.
 On 2 March 2011 Shahbaz Bhatti, Pakistan's Federal Minister for Minorities Affairs (a Roman Catholic member of the National Assembly), was killed by gunmen in Islamabad as he was travelling to work, a few weeks after he had vowed to defy death threats over his efforts to reform Pakistan's blasphemy laws.
 In November 2010, Asia Bibi was sentenced to death by hanging in Sheikhupura, Punjab, on a charge of blasphemy. She said the accusation was false and was simply revenge after an argument in a berry field over drinking water. The case sparked international reactions, and in 2018, thanks to international advocacy, Bibi was acquitted of the blasphemy charges after spending eight years on death row. Punjab Governor Salman Taseer was shot dead by his security guard for supporting Asia Bibi. Taseer had visited Bibi in jail and had held a press conference with her. He had told media that she would be released soon and the President of Pakistan will soon annul her death sentence. This triggered mass protests in Pakistan with many imams of local mosques claiming that Taseer had defied Mohammed and should be sentenced to death for it. Taseer was later assassinated in early 2011.
 In July 2010, a trader in Faisalabad complained that one of his employees had been handed a pamphlet that contained disrespectful remarks about Muhammad. According to the police, the pamphlet appeared to have the signatures and addresses of Pastor Rashid Emmanuel and his brother Sajid, who were Christians. The brothers were shot and killed while being escorted by the police from a district court. Both had denied the charge of blasphemy. Allama Ahmed Mian Hammadi, a Pakistani Muslim cleric, claimed that Shahbaz Bhatti, Pakistan's Federal Minister for Minorities, had himself committed blasphemy by branding the murdered Christian brothers as victims of Pakistan's blasphemy laws.
 On 9 July 2009, an FIR was registered against two teenager brothers, complainant falsely accusing them that they had spoken against Muhammad and this family had to leave the country for their safety. On 30 July 2009, hundreds of members of Sipah-e-Sahaba and International Khatm-e-Nabuwat 'IKNM' the banned Muslim organisations, torched the Christian homes and killed Christians in the Punjabi city of Gojra Faisalabad and in the nearby village of Korian, District Faisalabad. The professed reason for the violence was that a Christian had defiled and spoke against Muhammad.
 On 22 January 2009, Hector Aleem a Christian Human Rights Activist in Pakistan was arrested on a blasphemy charge. According to the FIR, someone sent a blasphemous text message to the leader of Sunni Tehreek. Hector Aleem was arrested because the sender had once contacted him. Hector Aleem, the Chairman of Peace Worldwide, had been working for a church in Islamabad which was demolished by the CDA (Capital Development Authority) for having been built illegally. When Hector Aleem objected to the destruction of the church he was faced with several threats and lawsuits ranging from fraud to criminal charges. He fought all of them in the courts and proved his innocence. He also faced several assassination attempts. Hector Aleem was eventually arrested on the charge of blasphemy.
 In February 2008, Special Rapporteurs of the United Nations Human Rights Council reminded Pakistan's representative of the matter regarding Raja Fiaz, Muhammad Bilal, Nazar Zakir Hussain, Qazi Farooq, Muhammad Rafique, Muhammad Saddique and Ghulam Hussain. According to the allegations received, the men were members of the Mehdi Foundation International (MFI), a multi-faith institution utilising the name of Riaz Ahmed Gohar Shahi. They were arrested on 23 December 2005 in Wapda Town. The police confiscated posters on which Gohar Shahi was shown as "Imam Mehdi." On 13 July 2006, the Anti-Terrorism Court No. 1 in Lahore sentenced each accused to five years of imprisonment, inter alia, under § 295-A for having outraged others' religious feelings. Since 27 August 2006, the seven men have been detained in Sahiwal Jail, Punjab, where they were forced to parade naked, and were suspended from the ceiling and beaten. For this reason, they were constantly threatened and intimidated by prison staff as well as by other detainees.
 Christians and Muslims in Pakistan condemned Dan Brown's novel The Da Vinci Code as blasphemous. On 3 June 2006, Pakistan banned the film. Culture Minister Ghulam Jamal said: "Islam teaches us to respect all the prophets of God Almighty and degradation of any prophet is tantamount to defamation of the rest."
 On 11 August 2005, Judge Arshad Noor Khan of the Anti-Terrorist Court found (another) Younus Shaikh guilty of defiling a copy of the Quran, outraging religious feelings, and propagating religious hatred among society. Shaikh's conviction occurred because he wrote a book: Shaitan Maulvi (Satanic Cleric). The book said stoning to death (Rajam) as a punishment for adultery was not mentioned in the Quran. The book said also that four historical imams (religious leaders) were Jews. The judge imposed upon Shaikh a fine of 100,000 rupees and sentenced him to spend his life in jail.
 In October 2000, Pakistani authorities charged M. Younus Shaikh, a physician, with blasphemy on account of remarks that students claimed he made during a lecture. The students alleged that inter alia, Shaikh had said Muhammad's parents were non-Muslims because they died before Islam existed. A judge ordered that Shaikh pay a fine of 100,000 rupees and that he be hanged. On 20 November 2003, a court retried the matter and acquitted Shaikh, who fled Pakistan for Switzerland soon thereafter.
 The police arrested Ayub Masih, a Pakistani Christian bricklayer for blasphemy on 14 October 1996 and jailed him for violation of § 295-C. Muhammad Akram, a Muslim neighbour to Masih, complained to the police that Masih had said Christianity was right, and Masih had recommended that Akram read Salman Rushdie's Satanic Verses. The same day that Masih was arrested, Muslim villagers forced the entire Christian population of Masih's village (fourteen families) to leave the village. Masih's family had applied under a government program that gave housing plots to landless people. Local landlords resented Masih's application because the landlords had been able to oblige landless Christians to work in the fields in exchange for a place to live. Masih's application gave him a way out of his subservience to the landlords. Upon Masih's arrest, the authorities gave Masih's plot to Akram. Akram shot and injured Masih in the halls of the Session Court at Sahiwal on 6 November 1997. Four assailants attacked Masih in jail. The authorities took no action against Akram or against the other assailants. On 20 April 1998, Judge Abdul Khan sentenced Masih to death and levied a fine of 100,000 rupees. Two judges of the Lahore High Court heard Masih's appeal on 24 July 2001. Shortly thereafter, the judges affirmed the judgment of the trial court. On 16 August 2002, the Supreme Court of Pakistan set aside the judgment of the lower courts. The Supreme Court noted Akram's acquisition of Masih's property and concluded the case had been fabricated for personal gain. The court also noted other breaches in the law of due process.
 In first of its kind case, a 30-year-old Shiite Taimoor Raza was sentenced to death by an anti-terrorism court, for posting blasphemous content on Facebook. He was booked in 2016 after he engaged in sectarian debate with a counter-terrorism official on Facebook.

See also 
 Apostasy in Islam
 Asia Bibi blasphemy case
 Court system of Pakistan
 Pakistan National Commission for Minorities
 Forced conversion to Islam in Pakistan
 Freedom of religion in Pakistan
 Islam in Pakistan
 Islamization in Pakistan
 Pakistan Penal Code
 Religion in Pakistan
 Religious discrimination in Pakistan
 Sectarian violence in Pakistan
 Women related laws in Pakistan

References 

People convicted of blasphemy in Pakistan
Blasphemy law in Pakistan
Pakistan-related lists
Law about religion in Pakistan
Censorship in Islam
Persecution by Muslims
Religious discrimination in Pakistan
Dynamic lists